The 2007 Peru earthquake, which measured 8.0 on the moment magnitude scale, hit the central coast of Peru on August 15 at 23:40:57 UTC (18:40:57 local time) and lasted two minutes. The United States Geological Survey National Earthquake Information Center reported that it was a Very strong earthquake. The Peruvian government stated that 595 people were killed by the quake.

Earthquake
The earthquake occurred as thrust faulting on the interface between the two plates, with the South American Plate moving up and seaward over the Nazca Plate. Experts say this kind of earthquake is produced about once every 100 years.

Coastal Peru has a history of very large earthquakes. The August 15th shock originated near the source of two previous earthquakes, both in the magnitude 8 range, which occurred in 1908 and 1974. This earthquake is south of the source of a magnitude 8.2 earthquake that occurred in northern Peru on October 17, 1966, and north of a magnitude 8.4 earthquake that occurred in 2001 near Arequipa in southern Peru. The largest earthquake along the coast of Peru was a magnitude 9 that occurred in 1868 in Arica. It produced a tsunami that killed several thousand people along the Peruvian coast and also caused damage in Hawaii.

Damage

The cities of Pisco, Ica and Chincha Alta in the Ica Region, and San Vicente de Cañete in the Lima Region were most affected. The earthquake was also felt in the capital Lima, where the quake broke windows in downtown sectors of the city, as well as various other Peruvian cities, including Pucallpa, Iquitos, Contamana, Trujillo and Cajamarca. They were attending mass at the time the earthquake started.

On August 16, the government reported 510 deaths.
The final losses were the following in total: 
 595 people dead;
 2,291 injured;
 58,581 houses destroyed according to Peruvian Government preliminary assessments;
 13,585 houses affected;
 103 hospitals affected; and
 14 hospitals destroyed according to Peruvian Government preliminary assessments.

Aftershocks
At least a dozen aftershocks of magnitude 5.0 or greater have been recorded.

The day after, survivors who could not be accommodated in local hospitals in Pisco were taken to Lima by airplane, arriving there later that night. On Sunday, August 19, the President of Colombia, Álvaro Uribe, arrived in Ica.

Tsunami warnings

A tsunami warning was issued for Peru, Ecuador, Chile, Colombia and even as far as Hawaii following the earthquakes, but was later cancelled. Some areas of the port city of Callao were evacuated. Tsunami warnings were also made for Panama and Costa Rica, and a tsunami watch was posted for Nicaragua, Guatemala, El Salvador, Mexico and Honduras. All alerts were cancelled after a  wave came ashore. A tsunami did occur on the Peruvian coast. It flooded part of Lima's Costa Verde highway, and much of Pisco's shore. The fishing village of Lagunilla completely destroyed by the tsunami resulting in 3 deaths out of 7 inhabitants, while survivors reported no significant earthquake damage. 

The Japan Meteorological Agency issued a tsunami warning, projecting that waves higher than  could reach Japan's northern island, Hokkaidō, on Thursday, August 16, around 19:00 UTC (Friday, 04:00 JST).

Response

The Government of Peru led the response to the earthquake through the National Civil Defence System ( – INDECI). It was supported by the military, the private sector (local, national and international) and by contributions from civil society and the international community, including governments, international NGOs and UN agencies. The initial response entailed searching for survivors, evacuating the injured, removing rubble, ensuring security and meeting the needs of affected people. Shelter was provided for those that had lost their homes, latrines were installed, clean water and medical services were established, food aid was distributed and education and psychosocial support was offered, especially to children. A Consolidated Appeals Process (CAP) in the wake of the earthquake raised approximately $37 million, $9.5m of which was provided by the Central Emergency Response Fund (CERF).

Despite the considerable relief effort, the initial response was chaotic, marked by a lack of coordination and inadequate information on the needs of people on the ground.  It was hindered by a lack of capacity at the regional level and consequent political wrangling (particularly between the local, regional and national governments). Many local authorities were personally attacked for the earthquake, as survivors tried to find close relatives or overcome the traumatic shock of losing so many family members.  As time passed the response became better organised, particularly once an OCHA coordination office was established in Pisco and a UN Disaster Assessment and Coordination (UNDAC) team arrived to support coordination and provide technical advice.

Aftermath
Several years on, Pisco is still feeling the effects of the earthquake and is struggling to recover. Many families who lost their homes are still living in temporary housing or tents. The  social/economic impacts of the quake may take many years to heal.

See also

 List of earthquakes in 2007
 List of earthquakes in Peru

References

External links
Perú earthquake: Videos

Peru
Earthquake
Megathrust earthquakes in Peru
2007 tsunamis
August 2007 events in South America
Earthquakes in Peru
Tsunamis in Peru
2007 disasters in Peru